Tomáš Berdych was the defending champion but withdrew because of a wrist injury.
Richard Gasquet won the title, defeating Benoît Paire in an all-French final, 6–2, 6–3.

Seeds
The top four seeds receive a bye into the second round.

Draw

Finals

Top half

Bottom half

Qualifying

Seeds

Qualifiers

Lucky loser
  Kenny de Schepper

Draw

First qualifier

Second qualifier

Third qualifier

Fourth qualifier

References
 Main Draw
 Qualifying Draw

O
Singles